John Grimston may refer to:
 John Grimston, 6th Earl of Verulam, British peer and member of parliament
 John Grimston, 7th Earl of Verulam, British peer